Ausenco Limited is a multinational engineering, procurement, construction management, and operations service provider to the energy and resources sectors. Its head office is in Brisbane, Australia. The company's name is an amalgamation of "Australian Engineering Company."

History
Ausenco was founded in Brisbane, Australia, in 1991, by Albanian Australian Zimi Meka, current CEO and Managing Director, and Bob Thorpe, current Board member. In 1995, the second office opened in Perth, Australia.

In 2002, the first institutional shareholders invested in Ausenco and former Queensland Premier Wayne Goss was appointed chairman of the company. Ausenco established the Ascentis division in 2003 to deliver operations solutions to the minerals processing industry. In 2004, Ausenco opened an office in China, and then in 2005, opened offices in North America and South America.

The company listed on the Australian stock exchange on 15 June 2006.

In 2007, the Vancouver office opened, increasing the number of employees by 31% to 1,010 people globally.  The Ausenco foundation was also launched in 2007 to offer support to the communities in which people from Ausenco live and work.

Ausenco began an expansion program in 2008 by acquiring several companies to enhance their service offering, including Vector Engineering, Pipeline Systems Incorporated (PSI) and Sandwell. This increased employee numbers by 150%, and expanded service offerings to include pipeline systems, ports & marine, environment & sustainability, and transportation systems. The Ausenco Taggart joint venture was also formed in 2008 to offer design and delivery expertise for coal handling processing plants.

In 2009, Ausenco acquired 50% equity in the Kramer Group to form Kramer Ausenco, expanding the company’s presence and services into PNG and the South Pacific.

Ausenco further diversified their offering in 2012 by acquiring 100% of Reaction Consulting, a Canada-based specialist provider of engineering services in the SAGD bitumen and oil sands sectors, to expand its capability and services in process engineering for the oil and gas market. The Ausenco Rylson joint venture was also formed to expand offerings in asset optimization and management services.

George Lloyd was appointed Chairman in 2013, which was the same year Ausenco acquired PROJEX Technologies Ltd in Calgary, Alberta and Halifax, Nova Scotia, Canada to expand capabilities in the oil sands market.

In mid-2015, Ausenco formed a Strategic Alliance with Spanish multinational construction company Duro Felguera S.A. to jointly pursue and deliver EPC projects globally.

In September 2016, Ausenco was privatized via a Scheme of Arrangement with RCF V.I. LP and key shareholders. Ausenco was subsequently de-listed from the Australian Securities Exchange.

In 2017, Ausenco created a Consulting business line comprising global practice areas including Mining Consulting, Environment & Sustainability, Pipelines, Transportation & Logistics, Integrated Technology Solutions, Asset Management & Optimization and Oil & Gas consulting.  In November 2017, Ausenco Hemmera, a leading environmental consultancy in Canada. Hemmera is part of the Environment & Sustainability practice.

Operations
Ausenco has worked on projects in over 90 countries around the world, and has around 2,000 employees as of 2018, across 26 offices in 14 countries.

Services are provided to clients primarily in three client markets: Minerals & Metals, Oil & Gas and Industrial.

Major Projects
Major projects have included:

 Chatree Gold Project, Thailand in 2000
 North Mara Gold Project, Tanzania in 2001 
 Sepon Copper Gold Project, Laos in 2002 
 Phu Kham Copper Gold Project, Laos in 2006 
 Hidden Valley Gold Silver Project in Papua New Guinea in 2006
 Lumwana Copper Project, Zambia in 2008 
 Isaac Pains Coal Mine, Australia in 2008 
 Martabe Gold Silver Project, Indonesia in 2009 
 Los Bronces Project, Chile 
 Kwale Mineral Sands Project, Kenya in 2012 
 Constancia Copper Project, Peru in 2012 
 Tonkolili Iron Ore Phase 2, Sierra Leone in 2014 
 Springsure Creek Coal Project, Australia
 Minas-Rio Project, Brazil in 2014 
 Mount Owen Using flotation to improve coal recovery

References

International engineering consulting firms
Multinational companies headquartered in Australia
Engineering consulting firms of Australia